Palmetto Middle School may refer to:

 Palmetto Middle School in Pinecrest, Florida
 Palmetto Middle School in Mullins, South Carolina
 Palmetto Middle School in Williamston, South Carolina